Our Lady of Luján is a celebrated 16th-century statue of the Virgin Mary, mother of Jesus Christ. The image, also known as the Virgin of Luján, is on display in the Basilica of Luján in Argentina.  The feast day of Our Lady of Luján is May 8.

History 

The Luján image was made in Brazil and sent to Argentina.  Tradition holds that a settler ordered the terracotta image of the Immaculate Conception in 1630 because he intended to create a shrine in her honor to help reinvigorate the Catholic faith in Santiago del Estero, his region.  After embarking from the port of Buenos Aires, the caravan carrying the image stopped at the residence of Don Rosendo Oramas, located in the present town of Zelaya.

When the caravan wanted to resume the journey, the oxen refused to move.  Once the crate containing the image was removed, the animals started to move again. Given the evidence of a miracle, people believed the Virgin wished to remain there.  The image was venerated in a primitive chapel for 40 years. Then the image was acquired by Ana de Matos and carried to Luján, where it currently resides.

Pope John Paul II visited the shrine during an apostolic journey.

Papal honors 
Among the Popes who have honored Our Lady of Luján are Clement XI, Clement XIV, Pius VI, Pius IX, Leo XIII, Pius XI, Pius XII, and John Paul II. In 1824, Fr. John Mastai Ferretti visited the shrine on his way to Chile. He later became Pope Pius IX and defined the dogma of the Immaculate Conception on December 8, 1854.

Because of the reputation of the shrine, Pope Leo XIII decided in 1886 to honor the miraculous statue with a Canonical Coronation. On September 30 of that year, he blessed the crown, which was made of pure gold and set with 365 diamonds, rubies, emeralds and sapphires, 132 pearls and a number of enamels depicting the emblems of the Archbishop and the Argentine Republic. The papal coronation of Our Lady of Luján took place on May 8, 1887. The celebrant chosen by the Pope for this event was Archbishop Federico León Aneiros who at that time made a pilgrimage in thanksgiving to Our Lady for sparing his archdiocese from the scourge of cholera.

On 8 September 1930, Pope Pius XI formally declared Our Lady of Lujan as the Patroness of Argentina, Paraguay and Uruguay. The Papal document was signed by Cardinal Eugenio Pacelli, the future Pope Pius XII. 

Cardinal Eugenio Pacelli served as the Papal Legate to the XXXII International Eucharistic Congress held in Buenos Aires in October 1934, and visited the Basilica on October 15. When he became Pope Pius XII, he made a radio address to the pilgrims in Luján on the occasion of the First Marian Congress in Argentina in 1947. 

In 1982,  during the Falklands War, John Paul II became the first pope to visit Our Lady of Luján. During this visit the Pope celebrated an outdoor Mass in the square of the Basilica of Our Lady of Luján and bestowed upon her the Golden Rose. Both in his homily of June 11 and his Angelus back in Rome reflecting on the trip, he commented on Our Lady's never failing maternal solicitude for the faithful in times of distress. Sixteen years later in Rome, John Paul II gave a replica of the image to the Argentine National Parish during his pastoral visit there.

The Golden Rose 

The Golden Rose is a gift from the Pope to nations, cities, basilicas, sanctuaries, or images. It is blessed by him on the fourth Sunday of Lent, anointed with the Holy Chrism, and dusted with incense. This Rose consists of a golden rose stem with flowers, buds and leaves, placed in a silver vase lined on the inside with a bronze case bearing the Papal shield. Pope Leo IX is considered as the originator of this tradition in the year 1049.

In the Americas, the Rose has been given to Our Lady of Guadalupe in Mexico, to Our Lady of Aparecida in Brazil, to St. Joseph's Oratory in Canada, to the Basilica of the National Shrine of the Immaculate Conception in the United States, to the Cathedral Basilica of Nuestra Señora del Valle in Argentina and to the Basílica Santuario Nacional de Nuestra Señora de la Caridad del Cobre in Cuba. On June 11, 1982, John Paul II personally bestowed a Golden Rose on Our Lady of Luján.

See also
 Ahí tienes a tu Madre (film)
 Basilica of Our Lady of Luján
 Blessed Virgin Mary
 Maravilla Americana
 Marian apparitions
 Penance
 Pope Francis
 Roman Catholicism

References

External links

 Our Lady of Lujan from Zsolt Aradi, Shrines to Our Lady, 1954
 Lujan Argentina
Virgen de Luján
Marcelo Pisarro, "La lujanera tropezó", en Nerds All Star, Revista Ñ, Diario Clarín, Buenos Aires, 26 de octubre de 2009.
 Parroquia Nuestra Señora de Luján de Longchamps
 Grupo Scout Nº 1 Nuestra Señora de Luján de Longchamps
 Centro Nuestra Señora de Luján de Longchamps
Diseñan un dispositivo especial para proteger la imagen de la Virgen
Papal honors, our lady of luján and the Golden Rose

Shrines to the Virgin Mary
Statues of the Virgin Mary
Catholicism in Argentina
Catholic devotions
Titles of Mary
National symbols of Argentina
Catholic Mariology
16th century in South America
Tourist attractions in Buenos Aires Province
Luján, Buenos Aires